Guillermo Alvarez may refer to:
 Guillermo Álvarez Macías (1919–1979), Mexican cooperative activist and general manager of Cemento Cruz Azul
 Billy Álvarez,  (born 1945), Mexican former businessman and former chairman of Cruz Azul 
 Guillermo Álvarez (born 1986), Venezuelan footballer
 Guillermo Alvarez (gymnast) (born 1982), American gymnast